Uchechi Lopez Sunday (born 9 September 1994) is a Nigerian professional footballer who plays as a striker for Nojima Stella Kanagawa Sagamihara in the WE League. The -tall athlete wears number 28. She is also member of the Nigeria women's national football team, nicknamed the Super Falcons.

Early years
Uchechi Sunday was born in Port Harcourt, Nigeria on 9 September 1994 as the youngest of seven sisters.

Career

Club
Sunday began her football career in 2004 with Rivers Angels F.C. in Nigeria. From 2009, she played in their professional team in the Nigerian Women's Premier League. On 14 April 2011, she signed with the Swiss club FC Neunkirch in Schaffhausen. She capped eight times in the Nationalliga B and scored 18 goals. In August the same year following the end of the 2010 FIFA U-20 Women's World Cup at Germany, she returned to her former club in Nigeria. At the beginning of 2015, Sunday joined the Belarusian team FC Minsk. She scored three goals in the first match with her new club. As end of May 2015, she had 14 goals netted in five matches only. She scored her 15th league goal in her 6th appearance on 20 June in the same season.

On 11 August 2015, she debuted in the UEFA Women's Champions League playing in the qualifying round match against Konak Belediyespor from Turkey. She scored five goals in the match, which ended 10–1 for FC Minsk. She netted one goal in the second, and two goals in the third match, totaling to eight goals in three matches of the qualifying round.

International
Playing for the Nigeria women's U-20 team, Sunday made her first appearance in a FIFA tournament at the 2010 U-20 World Cup in Germany, entering the Group C match-up against Mexico as a substitute. She also took part at the 2014 FIFA U-20 Women's World Cup in Canada, where she scored 3 goals in 6 matches. She scored three goals at the second round of the 2014 African U-20 Cup of Nations for Women.

She made her debut at the FIFA Women's World Cup and appeared in three matches of the 2011 FIFA Women's World Cup Group A for the Nigeria women's national football team.

References

External links
 
 

1994 births
Sportspeople from Port Harcourt
Nigerian women's footballers
Women's association football forwards
Rivers Angels F.C. players
FC Minsk (women) players
Nigeria women's international footballers
Living people
Nigerian expatriate footballers
Nigerian expatriate sportspeople in Switzerland
Expatriate women's footballers in Switzerland
Nigerian expatriate sportspeople in Belarus
Expatriate women's footballers in Belarus
2011 FIFA Women's World Cup players
WK League players
Nigerian expatriate sportspeople in South Korea
Expatriate women's footballers in South Korea
FC Neunkirch players
FC Nordsjælland (women) players
Expatriate women's footballers in Denmark